Martin Creek Lake State Park is a  developed recreational area in East Texas in the United States. The park is located southwest of Tatum on Martin Creek Lake in Rusk County and is managed by the Texas Parks and Wildlife Department. The Texas Utilities Generating Company deeded the park to the state in 1976, and it opened the same year.

Features

Recreation
The park offers year-round fishing, camping, paddling, lake swimming, hiking and cycling, water-skiing, picnicking, geocaching and nature photography.

Flora
Many types of hardwood trees like black oak are found in the park mixed in with loblolly pine and shortleaf pine trees.

Fauna
Wildlife found in this forested area include opossums, swamp rabbits, beaver, white-tailed deer, raccoons, armadillos and squirrels. Some of the most commonly seen birds are mallard ducks, great blue herons, green herons, great egrets, northern cardinals, blue jays, red-headed woodpeckers, cormorants and northern mockingbirds.

Fish in Martin Creek Lake include largemouth bass, crappie, channel catfish, yellow bullhead, tilapia and sunfish.

See also
 List of Texas state parks

References

External links

Rusk County, Texas
State parks of Texas
1976 establishments in Texas
Protected areas established in 1976